The Association of Caribbean States (ACS;) is an advisory association of nations centered on the Caribbean Basin. It was formed with the aim of promoting consultation, cooperation, and concerted action among all the countries of the Caribbean coastal area. The primary purpose of the ACS is to promote greater trade between the nations, enhance transportation, develop sustainable tourism, and facilitate greater and more effective responses to local natural disasters.

It comprises twenty-five member states and seven associate members. The convention establishing the ACS was signed on July 24, 1994, in Cartagena, Colombia.

ACS objectives and goals 

The Association of Caribbean States is intended to promote regionalism among the member states. The success and functionality of the ACS is greatly debated among scholars. The main goals of the association are "to confirm the new concept of the Caribbean Basin by (A) accentuating those interests the Caribbean nations hold in common and (B) working to eliminate barriers left over from its colonial past."

The organization seeks to use geographic proximity and regional cooperation (regionalism) for political and economic advantage with respect to the global economy and trade blocs such as the North American Free Trade Agreement (NAFTA), European Union, Arab League, and the South Asian Association for Regional Cooperation. The ACS has four distinct areas of interest: Trade, Transport, Sustainable Tourism, and Natural Disasters. Each is pursued by a Special Committee which meets at least twice yearly in order to discuss current regional issues and draft treaties.

 The Special Committee on Trade Development and External Economic Relations works in an effort to create larger economic actions in the Caribbean by uniting its member states through integration and cooperation. Through various annual forums the ACS attempts to create economic cooperation in an attempt to benefit and expand the region's economy.
 The Special Committee on Transport works to promote an Air Transport Agreement amongst the countries which have ratified the agreement. Security of travelers and the policing of airborne crime like drug trafficking also falls under the auspices of the Special Committee on Transport.
 The Special Committee on Sustainable Tourism aims to promote tourism which is environmentally friendly. The committee promotes the use of sustainable tourism which is healthy for the environment, and at the same time economically beneficial to the Caribbean as a region.
 The Special Committee on Disaster Risk Reduction which aims to coordinate the prevention and response to natural disasters in the Caribbean.  The main focus of this committee is to maintain organisation and attempt to maintain a high level of ability to cope with disasters.

Caribbean Sea agenda
One agenda adopted by the ACS has been an attempt to secure the designation of the Caribbean Sea as a special zone in the context of sustainable development, it is pushing for the UN to consider the Caribbean sea as an invaluable asset that is worth protecting and treasuring. The organisation has sought to form a coalition among member states to devise a United Nations General Assembly resolution to ban the transshipment of nuclear materials through the Caribbean Sea and the Panama Canal.

VERB programme 
VERB (Value, Empowerment, Resources, Betterment) programme aimed by ACS for empowering Caribbean peoples in all sectors (agriculture, education, fishery, etc.) with better resources and betterment of infrastructures in Caribbean by prioritising ecological and community welfare values and using renewable natural resources.

Performance evaluation 
The success of the ACS is debated by many scholars on both sides. Those who suggest the ACS is successful would point to the many initiatives the developmental coalition has undertaken, as well as its large membership and relations with other international organisations like the European Union. Those who suggest it is unsuccessful note how by the end of the 1990s, unlike CARICOM, the ACS had failed to establish a track record which was worthy enough to allow for the evaluation of the ACS as a developmental coalition. Furthermore, some scholars suggest that the ACS is unlikely to become a true player on the international level. Skeptics often point to other failed attempts at economic coalition building like the Central American Common Market (CACM) as an example of the instability of the region. The influence of NAFTA on the Caribbean outlines the future struggle of the ACS. The future of the ACS in relation to the western hemisphere is uncertain. "Despite governmental statements of commitment to liberalisation, it will be difficult for Caribbean countries to succeed in putting their economies on a firmer footing that would enable them to compete effectively."

Summits 

The ACS has held five summits involving heads of state and/or government:
 I ACS Summit, at Port of Spain, Trinidad and Tobago, August 17–18, 1995.
 II ACS Summit, at Santo Domingo, Dominican Republic, April 16–17, 1999.
 III ACS Summit, at Isla Margarita, Venezuela, December 12, 2001.
 IV ACS Summit, at Panama City, Panama, July 29, 2005.
 V ACS Summit, at Pétion-Ville, Haiti, April 23–26, 2013.
 VI ACS Summit, at Mérida, México, April 28–30, 2014.
 VII ACS Summit, at Havana, Cuba, June 4, 2016.
 VIII ACS Summit, at Managua, Nicaragua, March 29, 2019.

Membership

Member states

Associate member states

 
 
 
  on behalf of:
 
 
 
 
 
  on behalf of:

Observer states

Observer organisations

The Bolivarian Alliance for the Peoples of Our America - People's Trade Treaty 
Central American Bank for Economic Integration 
European Union 
Group of 77
International Organization for Migration
Organisation for Economic Co-operation and Development
United Nations

Relationship with other supranational organisations

Observer organisations
 Caribbean Community (CARICOM) Secretariat
 Caribbean Tourism Organization (CTO)
 Central American Integration System (SICA)
 General Agreement on Central American Economic Integration (SIECA) Permanent Secretariat
 Community of Latin American and Caribbean States
 European Union
 Latin American Economic System (SELA)
 MERCOSUR
 United Nations Economic Commission for Latin America and the Caribbean (ECLAC)
 Organization of American States (OAS)

See also 

 Economy of Latin America / the Caribbean
 List of regional organizations by population
 List of countries by credit rating
 List of countries by public debt
 List of countries by tax revenue as percentage of GDP
 List of countries by future gross government debt
 List of countries by leading trade partners
 List of Latin American and Caribbean countries by GDP growth
 List of Latin American and Caribbean countries by GDP (nominal)
 List of Latin American and Caribbean countries by GDP (PPP)
 East Caribbean dollar
 Sucre (currency)
 International status and usage of the euro
 Internationalization of the renminbi
 International use of the U.S. dollar
 Central banks and currencies of the Caribbean

References

Further reading 
 Gowricharn, Ruben. Caribbean Transnationalism: Migration, Pluralization and Social Cohesion. Lanham: Lexington Books, 2006.
 Henke, Holger, and Fred Reno, eds. Modern Political Culture in the Caribbean. Kingston: University of West Indies P, 2003.
 Heuman, Gad. The Caribbean: Brief Histories. London: A Hodder Arnold Publication, 2006.
 Hillman, Richard S. and Thomas J. D'agostino (editors). Understanding the Contemporary Caribbean. London: Lynne Rienner, 2003.
 Knight, Franklin W. The Modern Caribbean. na: The University of North Carolina Press, 1989.
 Langley, Lester D. The United States and the Caribbean in the Twentieth Century. London: University of Georgia P, 1989.
 Maingot, Anthony P. The United States and the Caribbean: Challenges of an Asymmetrical Relationship. San Francisco: Westview P, 1994.
 Serbin, Andres. "Towards an Association of Caribbean States: Raising Some Awkward Questions". Journal of Interamerican Studies and World Affairs (2004): 1-19. (This scholar has many articles referencing the politics of the Caribbean.)
 Byron, Jessica Lewis, Patsy. Responses to the sovereignty/vulnerability/development dilemmas : small territories and regional organization in the Caribbean 2013 video from Manioc.org

External links 

Association of Caribbean States—ACS members

International organizations based in the Caribbean
International diplomatic organizations
Intergovernmental organizations established by treaty
Organisations based in the Caribbean
Politics of the Caribbean
Organizations established in 1994
1990s establishments in the Caribbean
1994 establishments in North America
1994 establishments in South America
United Nations General Assembly observers